Flinders Chase National Park (formerly Flinders Chase) is a protected area in the Australian state of South Australia located at the west end of Kangaroo Island about  west-south west of the state capital of Adelaide and  west of the municipal seat of Kingscote. It is a sanctuary for endangered species and home to a few geological phenomena. It was the second national park to be declared in South Australia.

Flinders Chase National Park consists of three sections - an area of coastal landscapes around Cape du Couedic in the south west corner of the island, the Gosse Lands in the centre of the west end of the island and the former Cape Borda Lightstation reserve in the north west corner of the island.

Description

Location
It is located within the gazetted localities of Flinders Chase, Gosse and Karatta.

Extent
As of 1993, the national park consists of three separate parcels of land:

Cape du Couedic which is refers to the main parcel of land within the national park and which is bounded at the north by the West Bay Road and the West Melrose Track, to the east by the West End Highway and an unsealed track called the Sand Dune Track; and the portion of coastline extending from West Bay in the west to Cape du Couedic in the south and to Sanderson Bay in the east. This portion of the national park includes the following islands - Paisley Islet (also known as West Bay Island) at West Bay and the Casuarina Islets immediately south of Cape du Couedic.
The Gosse Lands - a parcel of land which is bounded by the Playford Highway to the north and the West End Highway to the west.
The former lighthouse reserve at Cape Borda.

Protected area designation
The national park is classified as an IUCN category II protected area.

History

Following a deputation of scientists in 1906, the premier, Tom Price, agreed to set aside the Cape Borda lighthouse reserve of 61 square miles as a nature reserve. and in 1909 the South Australian government converted another 79 square miles of what had been pastoral reserve to a nature reserve, under the control of the Fauna and Flora Board. The board had asked for 300 square miles but the additional properties needed had already been leased, and the lessees, who had yet to make any improvements, demanded £28,000 as compensation for losing what they had been getting for £28 per year  Professor Stirling urged that when those leases expired they be turned over to the Board.

The reserve was named Flinders Chase at the suggestion of Samuel Dixon (died 1927).
Apart from its intended use as a habitat for koalas and other mammals, it was considered a likely refuge for the lyre bird, "pheasant" (perhaps the malleefowl, [Leipoa ocellata]) and "bush turkey" (perhaps Australian brushturkey, [Alectura lathami]), all threatened on the mainland due to depredations by foxes. The Rocky River was touted as a platypus reserve.

Parts of the national park first acquired protected area status as a 'flora and fauna reserve' declared on 16 October 1919 under the Fauna and Flora Reserve Act 1919, an act whose specific purpose was:…to establish a Reserve on Kangaroo Island for the Protection, Preservation, and Propagation of Australasian Fauna and Flora, and to provide for the Control of such Reserve, and for other purposes.
No funds were made available for fencing or provision of a ranger however, and the laws regarding burning, shooting, poisoning and taking of protected species were unenforceable and broken with impunity.
The Chase's eastern boundary was now a straight line running south from the De Mole River mouth to the island's south coast. It also gave the board a couple of cottages for the use of a ranger and visitors.

It was constituted as a national park upon the proclamation of the National Parks and Wildlife Act 1972 on 27 April 1972 which repealed five items of existing legislation including the Fauna and Flora Reserve Act 1919. At proclamation in 1972, it consisted of the following land in the following cadastral units as well as the entirety of the Casuarina Islets - section 11 in the Hundred of Borda, section 64 in the Hundred of Gosse, section 17 in the Hundred of McDonald and section 66 in "South out of Hundreds".

Sanctuary
Since creation in November 1919, it has become a sanctuary for endangered species, some of them introduced from the mainland in the 1920s and 1930s. During the 1940s, 23 additional species were introduced, including koalas (1923) and platypus (1928). Most of these species can still be observed today. Kangaroos, goannas and echidnas are commonly seen in the national park.

Little penguins 
Little penguins have been recorded in Flinders Chase in the 1920s, 1930s, 1940s, and 1950s. In 1886, little penguins were seen at Admiral's Arch.

Geological monuments
The national park contains two geological features that have been listed as geological monuments by the Geological Society of Australia - Cape du Couedic and Remarkable Rocks.

Remarkable Rocks are naturally sculptured formations precariously balanced atop a granite outcrop. They remind visitors of the sculptures of Henry Moore.

Fire
The national park was again damaged during the 2019–20 Australian bushfire season, with the Visitor Centre  completely destroyed.

Gallery

See also
Protected areas of South Australia
Loch Vennachar
2007 Kangaroo Island bushfires
Rocky River (Kangaroo Island) 
Field Naturalists Society of South Australia

Notes and references

External links

Flinders Chase National Park official webpage
Flinders Chase National Park webpage on protected planet

National parks of South Australia
Protected areas of Kangaroo Island
Wildlife sanctuaries of Australia
Protected areas established in 1919
1919 establishments in Australia
Penguin colonies